The 2009–10 Harvard Crimson men's basketball team represented Harvard University in the Ivy League athletic conference during the 2009-10 NCAA Division I men's basketball season. The team played its home games in Cambridge, Massachusetts at the Lavietes Pavilion, which has a capacity of 2,195.  The team was led by third-year head coach Tommy Amaker and starred highly touted prospect Jeremy Lin.

Building on the success of the prior season when the 2008–09 team beat then ranked Boston College (#17 AP Poll/#24 Coaches' Poll) for the program's first win over a ranked team in the school's history,  The 2009–10 team broke many all-time program records including the following:
most wins (21)
most non-conference wins (11)
most home wins (11)
most road/neutral wins (10)

The team received a vote in the AP Poll four times: (November 23, January 11, January 18 and 25).  Amaker was a nominee for the inaugural Ben Jobe Award as the top minority Division I college basketball coach.  Amaker was recognized by Fox Sports as the 2010 Ivy League Coach of the Year.

As a result of its 21–7 overall record and a 10–4 Ivy League conference record, the team was invited to play in the 16-team single-elimination 2010 CollegeInsider.com Tournament.

Over the course of the season, the team was highly publicized, with Lin being featured in Sports Illustrated and ESPN, while the team's early match against defending conference champion Cornell  was written up in Time.

Preseason
The Ivy League held its pre-season media day on October 28, 2009, in Princeton, New Jersey.  The league's media unanimously voted Cornell the preseason #1 for the second straight season.  Harvard was ranked fourth.

Honors
Over the course of the season, the Ivy League office recognized several members of the team regularly for excellent play:

During the season, Lin was recognized as one of eleven finalists for the Bob Cousy Award. He was one of 31 midseason watchlist candidates for the Wooden Award.  At the conclusion of the 2009–10 Ivy League men's basketball season, Lin was selected as a repeat first team All-Ivy selection after becoming the first player in Ivy League history to record 1,450 points (1,471), 450 rebounds (487), 400 assists (401) and 200 steals (224).  He was also selected to the United States Basketball Writers Association All-District team.

Notes

Harvard Crimson men's basketball seasons
Harvard Crimson
Harvard Crimson
Harvard Crimson men's basketball
Harvard Crimson men's basketball
Harvard Crimson men's basketball
Harvard Crimson men's basketball